Abis is a village in Marib Governorate, Yemen.

References

Populated places in Marib Governorate
Villages in Yemen